Aklimpur is a small Brahman village  in Sohna Mandal, Gurgaon District in the state of Haryana, India. It lies near Badshahpur. Deva Ram Bhardwaj founded Aklimpur in 1829. It has a population of about 1,466, living in around 250 households. At present, in Aklimpur village vote count of Brahmans is 1000 (700 Bharadwaj, 300 Vashisht) and 200 votes of SC ST. 

There is Chandrasekhar Farm and Aravalli Hills to visit nearby. Aklimpur village is charming and clean; here, everyone lives with love.

The population consists of people from the Gaur Bhardwaj and Vashista Brahmin gotras.
Other villages in the Mandal include Abheypur, Alipur, Baai Khera, Badsahapur Thedar, Badshahpur,  Teekli (.4  km), Palra (1.5  km), Sakarpur (2.7  km), Darbaripur (3.4  km), Badshapur (3.5  km). Nearby towns include Farrukh Nagar (21.8 km) and Pataudi (23.5 km).

Education and employment
Local people work in the government sector and industries such as banking, education, defense services, police, politics, and science. More than 95% population of the village are educated and live a healthy lifestyle. 

In Aklimpur, many great personalities make our country proud. People like Dr. Ajay Vashisht, son of Shri Ramkishan Vashisht, the Director of Proteomics at Inception Therapeutics in San Diego, California, United States.

Politics
Shri Sudhanshu Bhardwaj (Lucky) is the present Sarpanch of the Village. He is a very young and famous sarpanch. His ethics, humbleness, and integrity towards his village people are blissful. He is honest with his roles and responsibilities.

List of ex-sarpanch with their tenure:-
Shri Anand Vashisht (2015-2021), Shri Hari Bhardwaj, Shri Mangat Ram Vashisht, ... . list will be updated soon...

The current Nambardar of the villages is Shri Satish Vashistha. A list of ex-Nambardar will be posted soon...

Airport
The nearest airport is Indira Gandhi International Airport  from Aklimpur.

Schools
 Govt. Secondary School Aklimpur.
 Udeya Bharti Public School.

Artists and Social Workers
Artists like HP Vashisth, Tony Aklimpur, Tushar S Gautam  (The Dream Hacker (youtube)),  and Akash Bhardwaj have been working and doing great work by writing and singing Haryanvi and religious songs. 

Social workers like Robin Bhardwaj (current member of panchayat), and Manish Vashisht are running a Gau Seva Dal.

References

External links 
 

Villages in Gurgaon district